Paysonia is a genus of flowering plants in the family Brassicaceae. They are generally referred to by the common name bladderpod or mustard. The genus is found in southern North America. Until 2002 it was considered to be part of the genus Lesquerella but was separated based on genetic and morphological features.

Species include:
Paysonia auriculata
Paysonia densipila
Paysonia grandifloa
Paysonia lasiocarpa
Paysonia lescurii
Paysonia lyrata
Paysonia perforata
Paysonia stonensis

References

 
Brassicaceae genera